The McNutt-McReynolds House is a historic house in Maryville, Tennessee, U.S..It was built circa 1900 for Robert G. McNutt, a merchant. It was designed in the Queen Anne architectural style. It was purchased by J. A. Reynolds in 1906, and by Dr. W. B. Lovingood in 1920. It was listed on the National Register of Historic Places on July 25, 1989, and was delisted on October 28, 2021.

References

Houses on the National Register of Historic Places in Tennessee
Queen Anne architecture in Tennessee
Houses completed in 1900
Buildings and structures in Blount County, Tennessee